Mahmoud Lotfi (born 9 January 1984) is an Iranian professional futsal coach and former player.

Honours

Country 
 Confederations Cup
 Champion (1): 2009

Club 
 AFC Futsal Club Championship
 Champion (1): 2006 (Shensa)

Individual 
 Top Goalscorer:
 AFC Futsal Club Championship: 2006 (Shensa) (8 goals)
 Iranian Futsal Super League: 2003–04  (Shahrvand) (36 goals)

References

External links 
 

1984 births
Living people
Iranian men's futsal players
Futsal defenders
Shahrvand Sari FSC players
Shensa Saveh FSC players
21st-century Iranian people